Norman McDonald (3 May 1898 – 31 January 1976) was an Australian rules footballer who played with Footscray in the Victorian Football League (VFL) and Williamstown in the Victorian Football Association (VFA).

Notes

External links 

Norm McDonald's playing statistics from The VFA Project

1898 births
1976 deaths
Australian rules footballers from Melbourne
Western Bulldogs players
Williamstown Football Club players
People from Williamstown, Victoria